Erna Gunilla Svantorp (née Karlsson; born 19 January 1964 in Fässberg Parish, Mölndal Municipality, Västra Götaland County (than called Gothenburg and Bohus County), Sweden) is a Swedish Social Democratic politician, member of the Riksdag, and schoolteacher. She was elected in 2010 for the constituency of Värmland County and took up seat number 162, after the 2018 general election she was assigned seat number 22.

As a recently elected MP of the Riksdag, she was assigned to the Education Committee as her main committee, she was also assigned to be an alternate for the Cultural Affairs Committee and the Health and Welfare Committee. She later gave up her position as an alternate for the Cultural Affairs Committee on 9 November 2010 her party colleague and the bench neighbor from Värmland, Berit Högman, became Speaker for the committee. She kept her seat as a member of the Education Committee, and after she retook her position as an alternate for the Cultural Affairs Committee up until 2018. After the 2018 general election she kept her position as an alternate for the Cultural Affairs Committee and for the Health and Welfare Committee, she also became an alternate for the Industry and Trade Committee. In 2019 she was chosen to be the Speaker for the Education Committee after the former Speaker was chosen by Prime Minister Stefan Löfven to be a part of the Löfven II Cabinet as the Minister for Higher Education and Research.

From 2003 up until 2010, she was a member of the County Council of Värmland Regional Council. In 2006 she was Speaker for the Staff Committee and vice-Speaker for the County Council Board.

She has been president of ABF Värmland. She has also been a board member and the president of Konstfrämjandet in Värmland.

Svantorp has a Masters in Philosophy, in pedagogy along with a high school teaching degree.

On 11 June 2019 received the French Legion of Honour of the Knight (Chevalier) class. The award was awarded to her by ambassador David Cvach at the Embassy of France, Stockholm.

Personal life 
Svantorp is the daughter of Jan Erik Karlsson and Ritva Karlsson. She resides in Årjäng. She was married to Eje Svantorp (1949–2014) from 1989 up until his death in 2014. She had four children with him.

Distinctions 
  Legion of Honour, Knight (France).

References 

1964 births
Living people
People from Årjäng Municipality
Members of the Riksdag from the Social Democrats
Chevaliers of the Légion d'honneur
Women members of the Riksdag
Members of the Riksdag 2010–2014
Members of the Riksdag 2014–2018
21st-century Swedish women politicians
Members of the Riksdag 2018–2022
Members of the Riksdag 2022–2026